Christ's College, Canterbury is an independent Anglican secondary day and boarding school for boys, located in the city centre of Christchurch, New Zealand.

Founded in 1850 by Reverend Henry Jacobs in Lyttelton as a school for early settlers, college is the oldest independent school in the country. The college currently caters for approximately 698 students from Year 9 to Year 13.

Christ's College is an International Member of The Headmasters' and Headmistresses' Conference (HMC). The Headmasters' and Headmistresses' Conference (HMC) represents the Heads of the leading independent schools in Ireland and the United Kingdom and International schools mainly from the Commonwealth. Christ's College is one of only three member schools in New Zealand. College is also member of Round Square, an international network of 230 schools in 50 countries around the world. Christ’s College is one of the three Round Square member schools in New Zealand.

History

Christ's College (formerly Christ's College Grammar School) was established in 1850 and directly modelled on the pedagogic vernacular of English public schools, such as Eton College and Radley College. The school was most likely named Christ's College by James FitzGerald, Canterbury's first Superintendent, after his old College at Cambridge (Christ's College, Cambridge). At its foundation, the school was run from two rooms at the immigration barracks at Lyttelton, and the emphasis was on a classical education, including Greek and Latin, Modern languages, Mathematics, English, History and Geography. Students were also expected to conduct scientific experiments, to draw and sing. It used to be closely associated with the Lyttelton Collegiate Grammar School which was also located in the Lyttelton Immigration Barracks.

The school left Lyttelton in 1852 and moved over the hill to the St Michael's parsonage in Oxford Terrace with 16 students. Henry Jacobs, the first headmaster, ensured that his school enabled both boarders and day boys to attend.

Christ's College moved to its present site in 1856, with 35 pupils and a staff of three. This location, adjacent to the Government Domain (now Hagley Park), provided the college with room to expand, and the school gradually began to acquire additional buildings. The first of these building were wooden, providing homes for the staff and their families and an increasing number of boarders. By 1863, Big School, the first of the stone buildings, had been built on the west side of the quadrangle in which all classes were taught (in present-day it is the school's library with additions by Sir Miles Warren and currently the oldest educational building still in use in New Zealand), followed in 1867 by the Chapel. The school developed slowly around this central quadrangle, and today the 'quad' is treated with reverence, and therefore students are not permitted to walk on it, only staff members and permitted visitors. The Cathedral Grammar School used to be the Lower School of Christ's College when it struggled financially from 1895 to 1922.

In its early days, the college taught boys as young as six, with each boy arriving with a different level of education. Subsequently, there was a wide age range in many classes and, until the number of classrooms increased, they were all taught together.

The school motto, Bene Tradita, Bene Servanda in Latin translates to "good traditions, well maintained".

Campus
In the original survey of central Christchurch (known as the Black Map), which was undertaken in 1850, it was envisaged for Christ's College and ChristChurch Cathedral to be built adjacent to one another in Cathedral Square, modelled on Christ Church, Oxford. The area set aside for the college in Cathedral Square, 3 acres 1 rood and 3 perches, was found to be insufficient. In a meeting in June 1853 between Henry Sewell, Henry Jacobs, Rev. Robert Bateman Paul, and Thomas Cass, Sewell took the group for a visit of a site earmarked as the Government Domain (i.e. botanical gardens). The group agreed on the site, subject to approval by Bishop Selwyn, which was later obtained. Years later, this land transaction was formalised through The Cathedral Square Ordinance 1858, a law passed by the Canterbury Provincial Council in October 1858.

The Christ's College grounds have a collection of nineteenth century, and turn-of-the-century buildings, as well as newly built buildings such as the Old Boys Theatre and the Fine Arts Building. The neogothic style is dominant, as was the case for most notable colonial-period buildings in Christchurch, such as the cathedral, and the original buildings of Canterbury University (formerly Canterbury College), which is now the Christchurch Arts Centre. 'Big School', built in 1863, is the original classroom for the Christchurch site of the school, and is one of the oldest surviving buildings of its type in New Zealand.

Upper department (College House, University of Canterbury) 
College House was created as part of Christ's College in 1850. According to College House:  The upper department became a residential college of the university after it was founded, and soon it was referred to as College House. The upper and lower departments (tertiary and secondary departments) separated in 1957, and College House became independent.

College life

Chapel

The chapel is an integral part of the school with compulsory religious education being undertaken until Year 11. Every Wednesday congregational practice takes place, in which the whole school sings, and practises hymns, psalms, prayers and chapel routine. Boys are also required to attend chapel on Monday and Friday mornings and usually alternative Sundays, even if it coincides with their own church service outside the school. The school chapel service takes priority and compulsory two services each term are required. Parents and family are welcome to attend Sunday chapel. Music is an integral part of school life, the Christ's College Chapel Choir consists of approximately eighty boys though changes yearly with the incoming year 9 group and leaving year 13's. The choir sings at chapel services, public and private events and takes part in several singing competitions such as the Big Sing, and in 2007 the international Summa Cum Laude Festival in Vienna (attaining second place).

Curriculum

The school offers students NCEA Levels 2 and 3 and scholarship examinations through NZQA. From 2022, they have discontinued NCEA Level 1 and replaced it with 'the College Diploma', a two-year course from Year 10–11. There are many academic disciplines offered at the school as subjects, varying from the standard English and Mathematics to French, drama, classical studies, physical education, art history, sciences and many other subjects. Mathematics is compulsory up to and including year 11. Year 9, 10, and 11 classes consist of a wide array of subjects to introduce students to different subject to see what they enjoy before having to select subjects in year 12 which go towards NCEA level 2.

Extra-curricular

Christ's College also places a strong emphasis on extra-curricular activities. Throughout the year there are opportunities in many areas; speech and drama, kapa haka, music, debating, model United Nations and several other activities. Performing arts are a large aspect of college life, with all boys expected to participate in at least one part; there is a Junior and Senior production each year (in collaboration with Rangi Ruru Girls' School or St Margaret's College), an annual House Singing competition and the REACTION House Play festival, where each house forms a group of students to perform a play for the Tothill Cup Interhouse Drama Trophy. Students are encouraged to partake in areas they have not attempted before, especially within these inter-house arts competitions.

Sport
Sport is compulsory for all boys; there is an extensive selection of sports available with boys choosing both a summer and winter option each year. As well as school sports, there are ongoing inter-house sports competitions, where all students are expected to participate in, or to come and support their houses. Extra sporting activities are also available: for example, the school ski club buses to the ski fields on weekends during winter terms. Sports facilities on site include Upper, the school playing field, an all weather facility, a 5-lane indoor 25-metre heated swimming pool, gymnasium and weights room. Offsite facilities include the nearby Christ's College cricket ground (which also has football and rugby fields) which consists of four hectares of South Hagley Park, and Kerr's Reach on the Avon River which is home to the Christ's College rowing club, consisting of a boat house which houses top quality rowing equipment.
It is claimed that a form of rugby was being played at the school as early as 1853. Each year its rugby team plays with Wanganui Collegiate School, Wellington College and Nelson College in a tournament known as the "Quadrangular". It also has a long-running rivalry with Christchurch Boys' High School, and an annual rugby match between the two schools is fiercely contested.

House system
In keeping with the tradition of English public schools, Christ's College has ten Houses accommodating around 700 students. There are three boarding houses and the dayboys are organised into seven more houses. Each house has a housemaster responsible for the care of the boys.

From the school's early days, Houses were a base for boarders within the school, and these changed their names as Masters came and went. The name Jacobs has been retained, while others have been replaced by School, Richards and Flower's. It was not until 1909 that the first two day-boy Houses were established. They were named 'North Town' and 'South Town', and students were allocated to them depending on whether their homes were north or south of Gloucester Street. In 1924, these Houses were named Harper and Julius – Condell's, Corfe, Rolleston and Somes have also been added over the years.

The year groups within the Houses are encouraged to build House spirit and to compete in sporting and cultural competitions.  Cricket and football games were established as soon as there were enough boarders to compete against each other, and gradually music and drama competitions have been added.

Day Houses
Condell's
Corfe
Harper
Julius
Rolleston
Somes
Jacobs (Transitioned to a day house end of 2016)

Houses for dayboys provide a place for study and recreation, a Common Room, showers and changing facilities, and areas for storing books and sports clothing. Boys meet here at the beginning of each day for House Assembly where they receive notices for the day and reminders of forthcoming events to prepare for from their Housemaster.

Boarding Houses

Flower's
Richards
School

In the boarding environment, the facilities and support systems are more comprehensive. Assisting the Housemaster are an assistant housemaster, a matron, and two live-in tutors who are also studying at university. Most of the school facilities, such as the library, computer room, gymnasium, pool, music and art rooms, and the workshop, are open for use by boarding boys out of school hours. Evening activities during the week include set times for homework, but recreational activities are also encouraged.

The Christ's College Boarding Programme keeps boarders busy in the weekends. With age-appropriate activities tailored to each year group's needs, boarders are given a number of opportunities that may not be available to dayboys.

Uniform

The black and white striped blazers and ties Christ's College boys wear are recognisable and well known especially within Christchurch. There are two types of uniform: Sport's Uniform, Dress Uniform (known by the boys as stripes or suits). During Winter terms dress uniform is worn on Mondays and Fridays, and sports uniform is worn on Tuesday, Wednesdays and Thursdays. Dress uniform is required for chapel services and other formal occasions. A high standard of dress is expected at all times and boys are punished for incorrect or incorrectly worn uniform, boys must always wear their blazers when in town, even with summer uniform.

Each house has a different uniform for inter house sporting events and is made up of a rugby jersey or singlet in the house colour and black or white shorts, depending on the house. Each different sport also has its own uniform for games, a black tracksuit with College crest is required for travelling to and from games venues and for field trips where the uniform of the day is not suitable.

Governance
The Christ's College governing body comprises a chairman, Warden and Fellows. The Bishop of Christchurch is ex officio Warden.

Current 
 Warden: Bishop of Canterbury, Peter Carrell
 Executive Principal: Garth Wynne

Notable alumni

Alumni of Christ's College are known as Old Boys, and may elect to join the school's alumni association, the Christ's College Old Boys' Association (CCOBA). Some notable Christ's College Old Boys include:

Academia
John McMillan (1951–2007), economist, former Professor of Stanford University
Murray C. Wells (born 1936), emeritus professor at the University of Sydney
Robin Williams (1919–2013), mathematician, vice-chancellor
Paul Wilson (born 1941), criminologist, Chair of Criminology at Bond University; crime author; sexual offender

Business

 John Anderson (1945–2018), chief executive and Director of ANZ National Bank Limited
 Don Elder, CEO of Solid Energy
 Peter Elworthy (1935–2004), prominent rural businessman
 Bill Hamilton (1899–1978), inventor of the jet boat
 Tim Wallis (born 1938), deer industry pioneer, developer of Warbirds over Wanaka
 Miles Warren (1929–2022), architect
 Richard Woods (born 1941), former director of the S.I.S.

Entertainment, media and the arts
 Denis Glover (1912–1980), poet
 Mark Hadlow (born 1957), actor
 Leigh Hart (born 1970), comedian, actor "That Guy"
 James Milne, musician, The Reduction Agents, known as Lawrence Arabia
 Sam Neill (born 1947), actor
 William Pember Reeves (1857–1932), author, historian
 James Reid (born 1974), musician, The Feelers
 Teddy Tahu Rhodes (born 1966), singer
 Lin Saunders (1908–1995), music critic, broadcaster

Military

 Edgar Kain (1918–1940), the first RAF flying ace of WW2
 Guy Newton, a RNZAF flying ace of WW2
 Charles Upham (1908–1994), war hero, double Victoria Cross winner

Public service
 Jack Acland (1904–1981), MP for 
 Michael Cullen (1945–2021), former Deputy Prime Minister and Minister for Finance
 Jonathan Elworthy (1936–2005), former Minister of Lands and Forests (1981–1984), member of Parliament for Waitaki, and farmer
 Michael Fowler (born 1929), architect and former Mayor of Wellington
 Jim Gerard (born 1936), MP for Rangiora and Mayor of Waimakariri
 Geoff Gerard (1904–1997), MP for Mid-Canterbury and Ashburton
 Arthur Guinness (1846–1913), politician, former Speaker of Parliament
 Sam Johnson (born 1989), organiser of the Student Volunteer Army
 Ed Latter (1928–2016), National MP for Marlborough
 Duncan MacIntyre (1915–2001), National MP for various electorates in the Hawkes' Bay
 William Fisher Pearson (1854–1888), MP for Ashley
 Derek Quigley (born 1932), National MP for Rangiora and co-founder of ACT
 Frank Rolleston (1873–1946), MP for Timaru
 Thomas (Tom) Shand (1911–1969), National MP for Marlborough 1946–1969, Cabinet Minister; Postmaster-General (1954–1957), Minister of Labour (1960–1969), Minister of Immigration (1960–1969), and Minister of Mines (1960–1969), and Minister of Electricity (1963–1969), farmer 
 Andrew Tipping (born 1942), Justice of the Supreme Court of New Zealand
 Claude Weston DSO KC (1879–1946), House of Representatives (West Coast), First President of the National Party (1936–1940)
 John Whitehead, Secretary to the Treasury (2003–2011)
 Kenneth Williams (1870–1935), MP for Bay of Plenty
 William Young (born 1952), President of the New Zealand Court of Appeal

Religion
 Charles Drennan (born 1960), 2nd Roman Catholic Bishop of Palmerston North (2012–2019)
 Vincent Gerard (1898–1984), 7th Anglican Bishop of Waiapu (1938–1944)
 Bernard O'Brien SJ (1907–1982),  New Zealand Jesuit priest, philosopher, musician, writer and former seminary professor
 Herbert Williams (1860–1937), 6th Anglican Bishop of Waiapu and a distinguished Māori scholar (1930–1937)
 Peter Carrell (born 1959), 9th Anglican bishop of Christchurch (2019–present)

Science and medicine 

 Edward Sayers (1902–1985), doctor, parasitologist and Dean of the University of Otago medical school

Sport
 Ian Botting (1922–1980), former All Black
 Anthony Cottrell (1907–1988), former All Black prop 
 Bruce Deans (1960–2019), former All Black
 Robbie Deans (born 1959), former All Black and former Crusaders, All Blacks and Australian rugby coach
 Peter Fulton (born 1979), New Zealand cricketer
 Roddy Fulton (born 1951), New Zealand cricket director, Canterbury and Northern Districts captain 
 Isaiah Punivai (born 2000), current Canterbury and Crusaders rugby player 
 Zach Gallagher (born 2001), current Canterbury and Crusaders rugby player
 Dallas McLeod (born 1999), current Crusaders rugby player 
 Jack Hazlett (1938–2014), former All Black
 Jock Hobbs (1960–2012), former All Black and former chairman of NZRU
 James Lassche (born 1989), current New Zealand rower
 Tom Lowry (1898–1976), New Zealand's first Test cricket captain
 Simon Maling (born 1975), former All Black
 David Monaghan (1922–1944), cricketer 
 Joe Moody (born 1988), current All Black prop
 Damian McKenzie (born 1995), All Blacks, Tokyo Sungoliath
 Marty McKenzie (born 1992), Chiefs, Maori All Blacks
 Arthur Ollivier (1851–1897), representative cricketer and mountaineer; chairperson of the Old Boys' Association (1895–1897)
 Ngane Punivai (born 1998), current Canterbury and Highlanders player
 Isaiah Punivai (born 2000), current Canterbury and Crusaders player
 Alastair Robinson (born 1956), former All Black
 James Ryan (born 1983), former All Black
 John Wright (born 1954), former New Zealand cricket captain and New Zealand and Indian cricket coach

See also
Lists of schools in New Zealand
List of boarding schools

Notes

References

External links

 Christ's College
 Christ's College Old Boys Association
 Corfe House
 College House, University of Canterbury

Boarding schools in New Zealand
Boys' schools in New Zealand
Educational institutions established in 1850
Member schools of the Headmasters' and Headmistresses' Conference
Anglican schools in New Zealand
Secondary schools in Christchurch
University of Canterbury
Anglican organizations established in the 19th century
Tourist attractions in Christchurch
Heritage New Zealand Category 2 historic places in Canterbury, New Zealand
Heritage New Zealand Category 1 historic places in Canterbury, New Zealand
1850 establishments in New Zealand
1850s architecture in New Zealand